Waldemar, Lord of Rostock (before 1241 – 9 November 1282) was the ruling Lord of Rostock from 1278 until his death.

He was the second eldest son of Hernry Borwin III and his wife Sophia (d. before 24 June 1241), the daughter of King Erik X of Sweden.  His elder brother John died before his father, so after his father's death, Waldemar inherited Rostock and ruled alone.  He died on 9 November 1282, or possibly one day later.  He was buried in the Doberan Minster.

According to some sources, he went blind some time before his death and divided his territory between his sons.  His sons ruled under the regency of their mother until 1284.  From 1286, his youngest son Nicholas ruled alone.

Marriage and issue 
Waldemar was married with Agnes, a daughter of Count John I of Kiel.  They had three sons:
 Henry Borwin IV (d. before 1285)
 John (d. before 1285)
 Nicholas I (before 1262 – 1314), Lord of Rostock from 1282 to 1312.

External links 
 Genealogical table of the House of Mecklenburg

Lords of Mecklenburg
Lords of Rostock
13th-century births
1282 deaths
Year of birth unknown
13th-century German nobility